Rúben Pereira (born 9 January 1991) is a Portuguese chess International Master, 2009 Portuguese chess champion, and 2007 World U-16 vice-champion. His January 2011 FIDE rating is 2436, making him the country's number three.

References

External links
 
 

1991 births
Living people
Portuguese chess players
Chess International Masters